Civil defense in Taiwan traces its modern roots to the Japanese colonial period and has recently seen a resurgence due to the increasing threat from China following the 2022 Russian invasion of Ukraine.

History 
Organized civil defense in Taiwan began during the Japanese colonial period. After taking over in 1945, the Chinese Nationalist government inaugurated the Taiwan Province Air Defense Command. This organization was primarily responsible for organizing air defense and evacuation. In 1949, it was renamed to the Taiwan Province Civil Defense Command. In 1973 the responsibility for civil defense shifted from the Ministry of Defense to the Ministry of the Interior with the National Police Agency taking over the civil defense infrastructure.

In 2022, Taiwanese civil defense units had 420,000 registered volunteers.

Government organizations 
The Civil Defense Act legislates the creation of civil defense units at four levels: city and county, district and township, state-run companies, and large companies, factories and schools.

Private organizations

Kuma Academy 
Kuma Academy provides civil defense training to civilians in Taiwan. Classes cover topics like first aid and media literacy (intended to combat disinformation from China). Kuma Academy has also provided training in open-source intelligence and cybersecurity. According to Kuma, their goal is "to decentralise civil defence."

Forward alliance 
The Forward Alliance is a Taiwanese national security and civil defense think tank. The group runs workshops to train civilians in disaster response and civil defense. Following the beginning of the 2022 Russian invasion of Ukraine, public participation in training programs run by the Forward Alliance increased greatly.

Shelters 
There are more than 117,000 air raid shelters in Taiwan, some dating back to the Japanese colonial period. During the Second World War an extensive network of bunkers and shelters was built across Taiwan to defend against allied bombing raids. Many more obsolete shelters as well as military bunkers have been repurposed as commercial, artistic, or public buildings.

See also  
 Jincheng Civil Defense Tunnel
 Qionglin Tunnel
 Total defence
 All-Out Defense Mobilization Agency

References 
 

Civil defense in Taiwan
Emergency management in Taiwan